Dornford Yates was the pseudonym of the English novelist Cecil William Mercer (7 August 1885 – 5 March 1960), whose novels and short stories, some humorous (the 'Berry' books), some serious thrillers (the 'Chandos' books), were best-sellers in the period between the First and Second World Wars.

This categorization of Yates's books is based on the list that appears opposite the title page of his last published work, B-Berry and I Look Back. All are full-length novels except where noted. Almost all of the tales in the short story collections were also published separately, often in slightly different form and with different titles in The Windsor Magazine: see the corresponding book article for details.

'Berry' books 

The 'Berry' books are comic novels and short stories narrated in the first person by Boy Pleydell. They feature the family group of Berry Pleydell (Boy's cousin), Daphne Pleydell (Boy's sister and Berry's wife), Jonathan 'Jonah' Mansel (Boy's cousin) and Jill Mansel (Boy's cousin and Jonah's sister).

'Chandos' books 

The 'Chandos' books are adventure novels narrated in the first person by Richard William Chandos. They often feature Jonathan Mansel (from the 'Berry' books), George Hanbury, and their respective menservants Bell, Carson and Rowley.

Other Volumes

Other works

Publishers
The eight books originally published in the United Kingdom by Hodder & Stoughton were re-issued by Ward Lock in 1943.

References

Bibliography

External links
 
 
 Dornford Yates – Original works

Bibliographies by writer
Bibliographies of British writers
Works